Leonard Blussé (born 23 July 1946 in Rotterdam) is a Dutch historian concerned with the field of Asian-European relations. Blussé has a prolific written output in his field, having authored, co-authored or edited more than twenty books since  2000.

He was elected a member of Academia Europaea in 2010.

Selected bibliography
 The 2006 Edwin O. Reischauer Lectures.

References

1946 births
Living people
20th-century Dutch historians
Historians of the Dutch East India Company
Leiden University alumni
Academic staff of Leiden University
Members of Academia Europaea
Artists from Rotterdam
21st-century Dutch historians